Once Upon a Time in Cyprus is a Turkish historical television drama series broadcast by TRT 1. It is set in 1960s Cyprus, and is based on the story of Turkish Cypriots' resistance against the extremist Greek Cypriot organisation EOKA-B whose activities were reported in the United Nations General Assembly on November 12, 1956. The series will explore all human rights incidents caused by EOKA-B that unfolded from Bloody Christmas until the Turkish invasion of Cyprus in 1974.

Premise 
The series takes place during the period of Bloody Christmas and depicts attacks carried out on Turkish Cypriots. It focuses on the activities of the Greek Cypriot nationalist group EOKA-B. The series is based on the island-wide violence that led to the civil war between Turkish and Greek Cypriots that ended in 1974.

Cast and characters

Series overview

Production 
Some parts of the series were shot in İncirli Cave, which is connected to Lefkoniko. Oğuz Vadili, President of the Chamber of Earth Science Engineers, stated that it is impossible to fix the damage that may have occurred during the production in the cave which was formed 200,000 years ago, and said that the filming should not have been allowed.

The families of the two Turkish Cypriot leaders' who were the subject of the series criticized the series for showing their relatives wrong. 

The newspaper of Halkın Sesi, which is run by Fazıl Küçük's son Mehmet Küçük and founded by Fazıl Küçük himself, appeared with the headline "Disrespecting to our leader and the historical facts". Mehmet Küçük stated that Fazıl Küçük was "almost ignored" in the series, "Our leader Dr. Küçük, who is presented as the second-degree man, is shown in a faint character." used the expression. 

Ender Vangöl, daughter of Rauf Denktaş, said that her father "never shared the pain of any of his children with anyone, especially crying at such a time", that the series "created a different character named 'Rauf' whoever the history consultants were." after she saw it is shown in the trailer of the second episode of the series where her father is crying to the Ankaralı about the death of his child.

Vangöl said, "We, as Turkish Cypriots, by such of mistakes, will lose our personaility and experiences of our honorable resistance, thanks to those who gave their approval without making a sound in the face of being told about our struggle for existence, which has been gained in 11 years."

Technical Crew 
The director of the series is Hakan İnan, its producer is Erol Avcı, and its executive producer is Engin Sarıal. The screenplay is written by Emre Özdür and Başar Başaran.

The Deputy Director of the series is Hülya Akdemir, and the Second Director is Harun Berdo. The Director of Photography is Hüseyin Tunç, the General Art Director is Burhan Türk, and the Art Director is Nanaz Bahram. The music of the series is prepared by Çiğdem Erken. The cast directors of the series are Rabia Sultan Düzenli and Emre Akbaş. The costumes of the series are designed by Oğuzhan Bozali and Ceyda Atlas. Post Production Manager is Burak Akgül. The editing of the series is made by Zeki Öztürk and Engin Behlül. Production Manager is Varol Ural, Production Coordinators are Engincan Malçok and Murat Toprak. Reji Coordination Officer is Cengiz Buğra Çakallı and Lighting Chief Mehmet Yavaş. Set Supervisor is Sezgin Sarıal.

References 

2021 Turkish television series debuts
Turkish historical television series